John Ashburnham, 1st Baron Ashburnham (15 January 1656 – 21 January 1710) was an English landowner and politician.

Ashburnham was the son of William Ashburnham and the grandson of John Ashburnham. His mother was the Honourable Elizabeth, daughter of John Poulett, 1st Baron Poulett. He sat as Member of Parliament for Hastings from 1679 to 1681 and again from 1685 to 1689. As a baron of the Cinque Ports he was one of the holders of the canopy at the coronation of James II in 1685 and coronation of William and Mary in 1688. He is thought to have become disillusioned with James and to have welcomed the accession of William and Mary. In 1689 he was raised to the peerage as Baron Ashburnham, of Ashburnham in the County of Sussex. He later served as Custos Rotulorum of Breconshire from 1702 to 1710.

Lord Ashburnham married Bridget, daughter and heiress of Sir Charles Vaughan of Porthammel House, Breconshire, at Westminster Abbey in 1677, from which substantial estates in Wales came into the family. They had several children. He died at Southampton Street, Bloomsbury, London, in January 1710, aged 54, and was succeeded in the barony by his eldest son, William. William was in his turn succeeded by his younger brother, John, who was created Earl of Ashburnham in 1730. Lady Ashburnham died in May 1719.

References

1656 births
1710 deaths
Barons Ashburnham
Peers of England created by William III
18th-century English landowners
English MPs 1679
English MPs 1680–1681
English MPs 1685–1687
English MPs 1689–1690